The Lucchini SR2 is a series of sports prototype race cars, designed, developed, and built by Italian manufacturer Lucchini Engineering, for sports car racing, conforming to the FIA's LMP675/SR2 class, and produced between 1999 and 2003.

References

Sports prototypes
Le Mans Prototypes